Singles 2001–2005 is a compilation album by Scottish rock band Biffy Clyro, released 7 July 2008. The album features singles from the band's time with former label, Beggars Banquet.

Overview
In 2006, the band signed to 14th Floor Records while still under contract with Beggars Banquet. The band still had one album left on this contract, therefore this album is to fulfill contractual obligations. Beggars has been criticized for cashing in on the success of 2007's Puzzle. Dozens of fans expressed anger at the label for only releasing a 12 track collection of radio edited singles rather than a more expansive album of b-sides and rarities (as Beggars subsidiary Too Pure had done for mclusky - the mcluskyism retrospective featured 57 tracks over three discs). The band and management are thought not to be pleased with the release and are not expected to promote or even look at it.

The album collects singles from Blackened Sky (2002), The Vertigo of Bliss (2003) and Infinity Land (2004).

Track listing

Credits
Simon Neil - Vocals, Guitar
James Johnston - Vocals, Bass 
Ben Johnston - Vocals, Drums
Songs and Lyrics by Simon Neil
Music by Biffy Clyro
Produced and Mixed by Chris Sheldon and Biffy Clyro

Release history
Singles 2001-2005 was released in the UK in 2008.

Biffy Clyro albums
2008 compilation albums
Beggars Banquet Records compilation albums